Muharem Kurbegović (born 1943), also known as The Alphabet Bomber, is an immigrant from the former Yugoslavia who firebombed the Pan Am Terminal at Los Angeles International Airport on August 6, 1974, killing three and injuring eight. He was allegedly motivated to commit the attack after being charged with masturbating in a dance hall. Although he was found not guilty, the arrest record resulted in his inability to get a business license for a dance hall and also affected his application for American citizenship. This resulted in his personal vendetta against a judge and the commissioners, which grew into demands for an end to immigration and naturalization laws, as well as any laws about sex.

Early life
Kurbegovic was born in Sarajevo in 1943. He studied engineering in Europe before moving to America in 1967, finding work in aerospace industries. He pretended to be a deaf-mute to dodge service in the Vietnam War. He frequently spent his time in dance halls, and was caught in such a venue masturbating in one of the bathrooms. After the trial over his lewd conduct, his ability to open a business, namely a dance hall of his own, was compromised. His application for American citizenship was also jeopardized. Kurbegovic swore revenge against the judge from then on.

Terrorist plots
Kurbegovic firebombed the houses of a judge and two police commissioners as well as one of the commissioner's cars. He also burned down two Marina Del Rey apartment buildings and threatened Los Angeles with a gas attack. His hat bomb, defused at a Greyhound Bus station, was the most powerful the Los Angeles Police Department bomb squad had handled in that time. He was one of the first to use what was called "information warfare", taking responsibility for other attacks under the alias of a SLA member named "Rasim".

Airport attack
The bomb exploded at 8:10 a.m. on August 6, 1974, inside a locker. There were about 50 people in the airport lobby at the time of the explosion. The terminal was evacuated after the blast. The explosion ripped through  of the lobby. Three people died in the attack, with two victims dying at the scene and an additional victim dying later at the hospital. Thirty-six people were injured in the attack, including a priest who lost a leg.

Kurbegovic was nicknamed "The Alphabet Bomber" because of his alleged plan to attack places in an order that would make an anagram of Aliens of America. "A" for airport, "L" for locker, etc. He later disputed this and stated that his objective was to "undermine and erode the foundation of Western Civilization, which is the Holy Bible".

Kurbegovic's trial was delayed for years on grounds of mental incompetence. He chose to defend himself at his trial, and frequently did odd things such as claiming to be the Messiah, and having outbursts at the judge and prosecutors. He was convicted of 25 counts of murder, arson, attempted murder, possession of explosives, and exploding a bomb. In August 1987, Kurbegovic was denied parole, after claiming he was infected with AIDS by prison officials.

See also
 Domestic terrorism in the United States

References

1943 births
Living people
Bombers (people)
Yugoslav emigrants to the United States
Yugoslav people convicted of murder
Los Angeles International Airport
People convicted of arson
People convicted of attempted murder